Cadarache is the largest technological research and development centre for energy in Europe. It includes the CEA research activities and ITER.
CEA Cadarache is one of the 10 research centres of the French Commission of Atomic and Alternative Energies. 

Established in the French département Bouches-du-Rhône, close to the village Saint-Paul-lès-Durance. CEA Cadarache, created in 1959, is located about 40 kilometres from Aix-en-Provence, approximately 60 kilometres (37 mi) north-east of the city of Marseille and stands near the borders of three other départements: the Alpes de Haute-Provence, the Var and the Vaucluse. It is one of the major sources of employment in the Provence-Alpes-Côte d'Azur region (PACA) and has one of the heaviest concentrations of specialised scientific staff.

Cadarache began its research activities when President Charles de Gaulle launched France's atomic energy program in 1959. The centre is operated by the Commissariat à l'Énergie Atomique et aux énergies alternatives (CEA, en: Atomic Energy and Alternative Energy Commission).
In 2005, Cadarache was selected to be the site of the International Thermonuclear Experimental Reactor (ITER), the world's largest nuclear fusion reactor. Construction of the ITER complex began in 2007, and it is projected to begin plasma-generating operations in the 2020s. Cadarache also plays host to a number of research reactors, such as the Jules Horowitz Reactor, which is expected to enter operation around 2021.

Facilities

The Cadarache center is the largest  energy research site in Europe, hosting 19 Basic Nuclear Installations (BNI) and a secret BNI, including reactors, waste stockpiling and recycling facilities, bio-technology facilities and solar platforms. It employs over 5,000 people, and approximately 700 students and foreign collaborators carry out research in the facility's laboratories.
ITER, the experimental nuclear fusion tokamak, is currently under construction at Cadarache and is expected to create its first plasma by 2025. When it becomes operational, ITER is hoped to be the first large-scale fusion reactor to produce more energy than is used to initiate its fusion reactions. Other nuclear installations at Cadarache include the Tore Supra tokamak – a predecessor to ITER – and the Jules Horowitz Reactor, a 100-megawatt research reactor which is planned to begin operation in 2020.

Activities
Numerous nuclear research activities are conducted at Cadarache, including mixed-oxide fuel (MOX) production, nuclear propulsion and fission reactor prototyping, nuclear fusion research and research into new forms of fission fuel. Nuclear waste is also treated and recycled at the site.

Notable incidents
A number of accidents, of varying severity, have occurred at Cadarache since its inception. Several incidents are listed below.
31 March 1994: A sodium explosion took place while the Rapsodie experimental reactor was being dismantled. The explosion was classified as a Class 2 incident by the ASN.
25 September 1998: A sodium fire occurred in a non-nuclear test facility, but caused no significant damage.
2 November 2004: A fire broke out, but caused no radioactive contamination.
6 November 2006: A fault in the equipment used to weigh MOX led to a grinder being loaded with more than the authorized amount  of fissile material, presenting the possible threat of a spontaneous nuclear reaction. Initially classified as a low-priority Class-1 level incident, it was subsequently revised to Class 2 by the ASN.
1 October 2008 : A fire broke out in a non-nuclear installation.
6 October 2009:  A higher quantity of plutonium than authorized was uncovered in the Plutonium Technology Workshop. The ASN classified the incident as Class 2, and suspended dismantling work on the workshop. After investigation, it was revealed that the cause of the incident was the accumulation between 1966 and 2004 of fine plutonium dust in the 450 glove boxes in the workshop. Following the incident, further inspections revealed that another installation, STAR, also showed quantities of plutonium in excess of the authorized amounts. The incident was classified level 1 by the ASN.

Seismological risk

Cadarache is situated on the Aix-en-Provence-Durance seismological fault, and lies close to another fault, Trévaresse. The Aix-Durance fault caused France's worst recorded earthquake in 1909. In a 2000 report, the ASN mandated the closure of six installations at Cadarache that did not meet aseismic construction standards; a similar report was issued by a French nuclear safety organization in 1994. By 2010, three of these had been shut down, with the remaining three to be shut down by 2015.

See also

National Ignition Facility
Nuclear energy in France
List of satellite map images with missing or unclear data

References

External links

Cadarache ITER website (in French)

Buildings and structures in Bouches-du-Rhône
Fusion power
Nuclear technology in France
Nuclear history of France
Nuclear research institutes
Radioactive waste repositories
Research institutes in France
Military nuclear reactors
Tokamaks
Nuclear reprocessing sites